Odostomia sulcosa is a species of sea snail, a marine gastropod mollusc in the family Pyramidellidae, the pyrams and their allies.

Description
The shell has a length of 2.5 mm.

Distribution
This species occurs in the following locations:
 Caribbean Sea
 Cuba
 Northwest Atlantic

Notes
Additional information regarding this species:
 Distribution: Off Georges Bank and Martha's Vineyard

References

External links
 To Biodiversity Heritage Library (4 publications)
 To Encyclopedia of Life
 To USNM Invertebrate Zoology Mollusca Collection
 To ITIS
 To World Register of Marine Species

sulcosa
Gastropods described in 1843